The Iranian Permanent Representative in Geneva is the official representative of the Government in Tehran next the United Nations Office at Geneva.

List of representatives

References 

Ambassadors of Iran to Switzerland
Lists of ambassadors of Iran
Iran Office at Geneva|Iran